Kaspar Treier (born 19 September 1999) is an Estonian professional basketball player for Dinamo Sassari of the Italian Lega Basket Serie A (LBA). He also represents the Estonian national basketball team internationally. Standing at 2.04 m (6 ft 8 in), he plays at the small forward position.

Professional career
Treier began playing basketball with Erkmaa academy before moving to ] in August 2014.

On 4 August 2017, Treier signed with Poderosa Montegranaro of the Serie A2.

In 2017 he won Italian Championship Under 21 and he was named MVP.

On 10 June 2019, Treier signed with Felice Scandone of the Lega Basket Serie A (LBA).

In July 2019, Treier signed with Basket Ravenna of the Serie A2 Basket (LNP)

On 3 July 2020, Treier signed a three-year deal with Dinamo Sassari of the Lega Basket Serie A (LBA).

National team career
With national Team Under 16 he won the European Division B in 2015.
Treier made his debut for the Estonian national team on 30 November 2018, in a 2019 FIBA Basketball World Cup qualifier against Georgia.

References

External links
Kaspar Treier at basket.ee
Kaspar Treier at fiba.com
Kaspar Treier at Serie A2 Basket

1999 births
Living people
Dinamo Sassari players
Estonian expatriate basketball people in Italy
Estonian men's basketball players
Lega Basket Serie A players
S.S. Felice Scandone players
Small forwards
Sportspeople from Tartu